Nelly Syro (born 1 March 1953) is a Colombian former swimmer. She competed in two events at the 1968 Summer Olympics.

References

1953 births
Living people
Colombian female swimmers
Olympic swimmers of Colombia
Swimmers at the 1968 Summer Olympics
Sportspeople from Cali